The following is a list of awards and nominations received by the Belgian filmmaking duo Dardenne brothers (Jean-Pierre and Luc Dardenne).

BAFTA Awards

Belgian Film Critics Association

Bodil Awards

Cannes Film Festival

César Awards

David di Donatello

European Film Awards

Globes de Cristal Awards

Golden Globe Awards

Gopo Awards

Guldbagge Awards

Joseph Plateau Awards

Independent Spirit Awards

Lumières Awards

Lux Prize

Magritte Awards

Robert Awards

Other organisation awards

Other festival awards

References 

Lists of awards received by film director
Lists of awards received by writer